Robert Smellie (also spelled Smillie, born 29 March 1869) was a Scottish footballer who played as a left back.

Smillie initially played for Annbank where he was in the side that reached the quarter-finals of the 1891–92 Scottish Cup and won the Ayrshire Cup in the same year. After signing for reigning English Football League champions Sunderland who were seeking to replace defensive players Donald Gow, John Oliver and John Murray who had all moved on, Smellie helped the Wearsiders retain their title in the 1892–93 season (along with former Annbank teammate Billy Dunlop and almost an entire team of Scots), but despite their collective success, it was felt they were stronger in attack than defence and by the end of the campaign he had fallen out of favour towards the end of the campaign and was not retained – Peter Meehan was brought in as a replacement and Donald Gow later also returned to the club. Smellie moved on to second-tier Walsall Town Swifts where he played for one season against the likes of Manchester City (in their final season of being known as Ardwick), Liverpool and Newcastle United, leaving a match against the latter in December 1893 with an injury which may have been significant as it was his last appearance for Walsall.

He has often been confused with the better-known Bob Smellie of Queen's Park who was a Scotland international in the same era, playing in the same position (circumstantial evidence, and more significantly both men playing matches for different clubs on the same day, has shown them to be two different people). Due to this issue, few of his personal details are published consistently.

References

1869 births
Year of death missing
Footballers from North Lanarkshire 
Sportspeople from Wishaw 
Scottish footballers
Walsall F.C. players
English Football League players
Annbank F.C. players
Sunderland A.F.C. players
Association football fullbacks